Skattum is a Norwegian surname. Notable people with the surname include:

Dan Skattum, American politician
Haagen Skattum (1824–1900), Norwegian businessman and politician
Ole Jacob Skattum (1862–1930), Norwegian geographer, educator, and politician

Norwegian-language surnames